Schwarz-Weiß Essen is a German association football club based in Essen, North Rhine-Westphalia. The side has its origins in the gymnastics club Essener Turnerbund founded in 1881. A football department was formed in January 1900 and this became a separate entity within the club on 1 July 1974.

History
In 1933, the club joined the Gauliga Niederrhein, one of sixteen top flight divisions formed in the re-organization of German football under the Third Reich. They played at that level until being relegated in 1943, with their best results being a string of three consecutive second-place finishes between 1937 and 1940.

SWE returned to tier I football in 1951 in the Oberliga West, and except for spending the 1958, 1959, and 1961 seasons in the second division, played in the top flight until the 1963 formation of the Bundesliga, Germany's first professional football league.

Their moment of glory came in 1959 when a non-descript side beat Rot-Weiss Essen 1–0, Hertha BSC 6–3, and Hamburger SV 2–1 on their way to thrashing Borussia Neunkirchen 5–2 to take the DFB-Pokal. Their 1959 German Cup win made them the first ever second division side to win the trophy.

After 1963, Schwarz-Weiß played as a second-tier side in the Regionalliga West and 2. Bundesliga Nord into the late 1970s. They fell a point short of a place in the Bundesliga in 1967, finishing behind Borussia Neunkirchen in the league qualification rounds. In 1978, they descended into the then third division to the Oberliga Nordrhein and played in this league until it was disbanded in 2008. They became part of the new NRW-Liga after that and in 2012, when the latter was disbanded again, of the Oberliga Niederrhein.

Former managers
 Klaus Berge 19 May 2008 to 30 June 2009
 Fred Bockholt 3 May 2008 to 18 May 2008
 Frank Kontny 1 July 2006 to 2 May 2008
 Klaus Täuber April 2004 to 30 June 2006
 Frank Benatelli April 2000 to April 2004
 Detlef Wiemers September 1999 to April 2000
 Jörg Jung July 1998 to September 1999
 Frank Kontny March 1998 to June 1998
 Dietmar Grabotin July 1995 to March 1998
 Jürgen Kaminsky July 1994 to June 1995
 Detlef Pirsig July 1993 to June 1994
 Friedhelm Wessendorf April 1993 to June 1993
 Gerd Zewe January 1993 to April 1993
 Heiko Mertes July 1992 to December 1992
 Fred Bockholt July 1989 to June 1992
 Horst Döppenschmidt July 1988 to June 1989
 Fred Bockholt July 1983 to June 1988
 Manfred Rummel January 1981 to June 1983
 Dieter Tartemann July 1977 to December 1980
 Hubert Schieth January 1975 to June 1977
 Albert Becker July 1974 to January 1975
 Peter Velhorn July 1973 to April 1974
 Waldemar Gerhardt July 1972 to June 1973
 Heinz Höher October 1970 to June 1972
 Peter Sievers October 1970
 Kurt Sahm July 1970 to October 1970
 Horst Witzler July 1966 to June 1970
 Hans Wendlandt July 1964 to June 1966
 Willibald Hahn July 1963 to June 1964
 Kuno Klötzer July 1961 to June 1963
 Hans Wendlandt July 1959 to June 1961
 Willy Multhaup July 1957 to June 1959
 Karl Winkler July 1954 to June 1957
 Fritz Buchloh July 1952 to June 1954
 Richard Longin July 1951 to June 1952
 Josef Uridil July 1949 to June 1951
 Werner Sottong July 1945 to June 1949
 Josef Uridil July 1938 to 1942
 Pammer July 1936 to June 1938
 Theodor Lohrmann 1935 to 1936
 Kurt Otto August 1933 to 1935
 Hans Schmidt 1932 to July 1933
 Preis 1930 to 1932
 Herzka 1929 to 1930
 Hans Schulte 1926 to 1929
 Izidor Kürschner 1924 to 1926

Rivalries
In the past, the local derbies versus Rot-Weiß Essen were big events, sometimes followed by more than 30,000 fans, however since their rivals decline the rivalry has waned in importance. Although often clouded in political terms, the "reds" were meant to be left-wing and the "blacks" right-wing, in reality there was no real distinction. The rivalry was more based on geography of the city, a north (RWE) versus south (SWE) city divide.

Honours

Senior Team
 DFB-Pokal
 Winners: 1959
 2. Oberliga West
 Champions: 1961

Youth Team
 German Under 17 championship
 Runners-up: 1986

References

External links
 Official website 
 Abseits Guide to German Football

 
1881 establishments in Germany
Association football clubs established in 1900
Sports clubs established in 1881
Sport in Essen
Football clubs in Germany
Football clubs in North Rhine-Westphalia
2. Bundesliga clubs